Coowee Scoorice Black Bear (October 11, 1899 – July 1976) was a professional football player who played in the National Football League during the 1923 season. That season, he joined the NFL's Oorang Indians. The Indians were a team based in LaRue, Ohio, composed only of Native Americans, and coached by Jim Thorpe.

Notes

References
 

1899 births
1976 deaths
American football ends
Native American players of American football
Oorang Indians players
Players of American football from Oklahoma